The FMW Anniversary Show was the biggest annual professional wrestling supercard promoted by the Japanese hardcore wrestling promotion Frontier Martial-Arts Wrestling (FMW) between 1990 to 2001 to celebrate the anniversary of the company. The ninth edition of the event was the first to be broadcast on pay-per-view.

Dates and venues

References

External links
FMW Anniversary Show results

 
Professional wrestling anniversary shows